Waller House, also known as the Waller-Joyner Farm, is a historic home located near Pfafftown, Forsyth County, North Carolina.  The original 1 /2-story hewn log dwelling was built about 1770–1790, and later used as a kitchen. It is located adjacent to a 2-story hewn log dwelling built about 1800–1820.  An open L-shaped porch was added in the 1940s connecting the two dwellings.

It was listed on the National Register of Historic Places in 2014.

References

Log houses in the United States
Houses on the National Register of Historic Places in North Carolina
Houses completed in 1790
Houses in Forsyth County, North Carolina
National Register of Historic Places in Forsyth County, North Carolina
Log buildings and structures on the National Register of Historic Places in North Carolina